= Papakowhai Homestead =

Historic building in Porirua, New Zealand

General information
- Type: Residential home
- Location: 1 Bowlers Wharf Lane, Papakowhai, Porirua 5024, Porirua, New Zealand
- Coordinates: 41.11563°S 174.86193°E
- Owner: Private

Heritage New Zealand – Category 1
- Designated: 25 September 1986
- Reference no.: 2890

References
- "Papakowhai Homestead". New Zealand Heritage List/Rārangi Kōrero. Heritage New Zealand.

Papakowhai Homestead is a historic building in Porirua, New Zealand.

The homestead has great regional significance as it dates to the first decades of organised Pakeha settlement in the Porirua area. It is believed that the back portion of the house dates from c.1848 when the Bowler family farmed the area.

Papakowhai Homestead was listed by the New Zealand Historic Places Trust (since renamed to Heritage New Zealand) as a Category I historic place in 1986.
